Tahmoh Penikett (born May 20, 1975) is a Canadian actor. He is known for playing Karl "Helo" Agathon on SyFy's 2004 television series Battlestar Galactica. He has appeared in TV series Supernatural, Dollhouse, the Showcase time travel show Continuum, and as the antagonist Darius in the 2006 racing video game Need for Speed: Carbon.

Early life
Penikett was born in Whitehorse, Yukon. He is the son of former Yukon premier Tony Penikett, who moved to Victoria, British Columbia from England at age 12, and Lulla Sierra Johns, of the White River First Nation in the Yukon. He has two siblings, twin sisters Sarah and Stephanie. He graduated from the Victoria Motion Picture School and studied at the Lyric School of Acting in Vancouver.

Career
In 2002, he had a brief appearance as one of the first Human-Form Replicators in the season 6 episode of Stargate SG-1, "Unnatural Selection". From 2004-2005, Penikett portrayed Ray Chase, who appeared in eleven episodes of the Canadian police drama, Cold Squad. He played a leading role as Noah Hamilton in the 2005 made-for-TV film Hush alongside actress Tori Spelling. He had a role in the video game Need for Speed: Carbon, as a street racer named Darius. He also appeared in four episodes of the television series Whistler as Elias Noth. Penikett also provided voice talent for antagonist Troy Hammerschmidt on the Adult Swim show Titan Maximum. In 2010, Penikett played the lead role of Matt Ellman on Syfy's miniseries Riverworld an adaption of the science fiction books written by Philip José Farmer of the same name. He starred in the first two episodes of Warner Brothers' Mortal Kombat: Legacy as Kurtis Stryker, which debuted in April on YouTube; he was replaced by Eric Jacobus for season 2.

Among his early acting work were stints on assorted Canadian TV series such as Cold Squad. He also appeared on the TV show Smallville, in the episode "Resurrection" in Season 3 as Vince Davis, and in the Season 6 episodes "Nemesis" and "Prototype" as Sgt. Wes Keenan. He portrayed a police officer for a predominantly gay neighbourhood in the 2004 The L Word episode "Losing It", which starred Battlestar Galactica co-star Nicki Clyne in a related storyline.

In 2003, the 1978 science fiction television series Battlestar Galactica was "reimagined" as a three-hour miniseries on the SciFi Channel. The miniseries was filmed in Vancouver, British Columbia, Canada, and Penikett, a local actor, auditioned and was cast in the part of Karl "Helo" Agathon, an officer in the Colonial Fleet. The miniseries proved highly successful, and a Battlestar Galactica series was commissioned.
The role was not based on a character in the original series, and was meant to be confined only to the miniseries; in the miniseries Helo is shown giving up a spot on a spaceship fleeing the doomed planet of Caprica, with the implication that he was left to die. However, both the producers and test audiences were sufficiently impressed with the character, and Penikett's performance, that the decision was made to make Helo a recurring character on the show. A plot that took place over much of the show's first season was that the Cylons on Caprica kept Helo alive in order to have him fall in love with, and impregnate, a Cylon (Helo was chosen because his crew partner, Sharon Valerii, was in fact a Cylon, and another copy of the same model was sent to pretend to be her). By the second season, his character had returned to the Galactica; as the father of the only successful human-Cylon hybrid; this character and his family became central to the show's mythology.

In 2009, Penikett was cast as Paul Ballard in Joss Whedon's science fiction drama television series Dollhouse, which aired on Fox network Friday nights at 9:00. 

Dollhouse was canceled at the end of its second season, and the series finale aired on Friday, January 29, 2010. In 2012, he guest-starred as a politician named Jim Martin in the first season of Showcase's Continuum. He returned as a recurring character in the second season of the show. In 2013, Penikett was cast on the CW TV series Supernatural as a fallen angel who claimed to be Ezekiel, appearing in the show's ninth season premiere. The character's real name was revealed as Gadreel in episode nine and Penikett reprised the role in episode ten. He has since reprised the roles in episodes eighteen, twenty-one and twenty-two. He also landed another recurring role on the mid-season drama Star-Crossed, which premiered in February 2014.

In 2014, Penikett guest-starred in the 200th episode of Criminal Minds as Michael Hastings, an ex-CIA agent and leader of the terrorist group, The Regime Squad. Since 2014, he has also starred in the award-winning web series Riftworld Chronicles.

Personal life
Penikett lives in Vancouver with his family.

In his youth, Penikett studied Judo before switching to Muay Thai 

In April 2008, in support of the Babz Chula Lifeline for Artists Society, which raised money for their (late) friend and fellow Canadian actor Chula's cancer treatment, Penikett and his Battlestar Galactica colleague Kandyse McClure auctioned off dinner with the two of them in Vancouver.

Filmography

Television

References

External links

 

1975 births
Male actors from Yukon
Canadian Muay Thai practitioners
Canadian people of English descent
Canadian male film actors
Canadian male television actors
Canadian male voice actors
First Nations male actors
Living people
People from Whitehorse
20th-century Canadian male actors
21st-century Canadian male actors
Tutchone people